Binu Girija is an Indian American entrepreneur. He is the founder and product architect of Way.com, an online marketplace for services.

Early life and career 
Girija completed his bachelor's degree in Computer Science and Engineering from a University in India. After graduation, he joined BEA Systems as an enterprise architect. Later, he joined Oracle Corporation and then Computer Sciences Corporation. He founded four startups, two of which were failure.

In 2013, Girija founded Way.

In media 
The fictional character of Erlich Bachman in the TV series Silicon Valley portrayed by TJ Miller is based on Girija's personality. But according to Girija, he is more self-deprecating than the character.

References 

American businesspeople
Living people
Place of birth missing (living people)
Year of birth missing (living people)